The following are the national records in athletics in Japan maintained by Japan's Association of Athletics Federations (JAAF).

Outdoor

Key to tables:

+ = en route to a longer distance

A = affected by altitude

a = aided road course according to IAAF rule 260.28

NWI = no wind information

Men

Women

Mixed

Indoor

Men

Women

Notes

See also
 Japan Championships in Athletics

References
General
Japanese Outdoor Records – Men 9 September 2022 updated
Japanese Outdoor Records – Women 9 September 2022 updated
Japanese Indoor Records – Men 22 September 2021 updated
Japanese Indoor Records – Women 9 September 2022 updated
Specific

External links
JAAF web site

Japan
Records
Athletics
Athletics